This is a list of England women's international footballers – association football players who have played for the England women's national football team. This table takes into account all official England matches.

Legacy numbers were introduced in November 2022 to mark the 50th anniversary of an official England women's team.

Key

Table

References

Bibliography
 
 
 

 
Lists of England international footballers
England
Association football player non-biographical articles